Jacob Joshua McClain High School  was a junior and senior high school in unincorporated Holmes County, Mississippi, United States, about  south of Lexington. It is operated by the Holmes County School District. Its campus is presently used by Holmes County Central High School.

As of circa 2006 it had 842 students. It was named after one of its former principals.

History
Originally named the Lexington Attendance Center, it opened in 1959. It was, at the time, an all-black school. It was renamed in 1985.

In 2015 the high school sectors of McClain, S.V. Marshall High School, and Williams-Sullivan High School consolidated into Holmes County Central High School.

Enrollment statistics

Students & Faculty
Total Students 877 students
% Male / % Female 53%  /  47%
Total Classroom Teachers 40 teachers
Students by Grade Grade 6 - 123 students
Grade 7 - 138 students
Grade 8 - 136 students
Grade 9 - 155 students
Grade 10 - 117 students
Grade 11 - 101 students
Grade 12 - 93 students
Grade Not Listed - 14 students

References

External links

Schools in Holmes County, Mississippi
Public high schools in Mississippi
Public middle schools in Mississippi
1959 establishments in Mississippi
Educational institutions established in 1959